is a fishing video game published by Sega for arcade games, Dreamcast and Microsoft Windows in 1999-2002.

Gameplay
The gameplay's emphasis was on enticing fish to bite onto the lure and then successfully fighting the fish and reeling it to the boat.

As the player catches fish, they earn item cards. Items earned with these cards include fish and artifacts for an aquarium, fishing equipment, additional boats, and various goofy accessories such as different colored shorts. The game also featured two modes of online play: tournament fishing and "fish mail". In tournament fishing, players competed to catch the biggest fish within a species. Fish mail consisted of writing short messages. Players could receive random messages by catching fish.

Sega Marine Fishing can be played using the Dreamcast fishing rod controller. Players can customize their character with hats, shirts, etc.

This game is a direct sequel to Sega Bass Fishing.

Reception

The Dreamcast version received "generally favorable reviews" according to the review aggregation website Metacritic. Eric Bratcher of NextGen said of the game, "Any tournament or, better yet, online play would have landed this five stars. As it is, it's just cool." In Japan, Famitsu gave it a score of 27 out of 40.

Notes

See also
Sega Bass Fishing 2

References

External links
 
 

1999 video games
Arcade video games
Dreamcast games
Fishing video games
Sega arcade games
Sega video games
Windows games
SIMS Co., Ltd. games
Video games developed in Japan